IK Kongahälla is a Swedish football club located in Kungälv.

Background
IK Kongahälla currently plays in Division 4 Göteborg A which is the sixth tier of Swedish football. They play their home matches at the IP Kongevi in Kungälv.

The club is affiliated to Göteborgs Fotbollförbund. IK Kongahälla have competed in the Svenska Cupen on 28 occasions and have played 70 matches in the competition.

Season to Season

Footnotes

External links
 IK Kongahälla – Official website
 IK Kongahälla on Facebook

Football clubs in Gothenburg
Association football clubs established in 1906
1906 establishments in Sweden
Football clubs in Västra Götaland County